Peciu Nou (or Neuwien, "New Vienna") is a commune in Timiș County, Romania. It is composed of three villages: Diniaș, Peciu Nou (commune seat) and Sânmartinu Sârbesc.

Name

History 

The territory of the commune has been inhabited since ancient times. During the Dacian statehood and the Roman rulership, a Roman colony was established here under the name Vibech.  During the Migration Period, Peciu Nou fell under Hungarian rule; the first recorded mention of Peciu Nou also comes from this time (1332, Veybech). Between 1401–1406, the locality was a royal domain with urban status (opidum regis Vybech). In 1526 Hungary became a pashalik; after this period the sultan colonized many Serbs in Banat, and the name of the locality was changed from Vibech to Peciui.

The locality did not appear on Count Mercy's maps from 1723–1725, suggesting that the settlement was destroyed during the Ottoman–Habsburg wars. The first German settlers arrived here in 1723 and came mainly from Cologne and Mainz. The conscription (census) of 1743 noted a settlement with the name Uypez. At one time it was also called Neu Wien ("New Vienna").

Demographics 

Peciu Nou had a population of 4,982 inhabitants at the 2011 census, down 0.2% from the 2002 census. Most inhabitants are Romanians (77.84%), with the larger minorities being Serbs (13.53%), Hungarians (2.03%) and Ukrainians (1.14%). 3.81% of the population's ethnicity is unknown. By religion, most inhabitants are Orthodox (73.4%), but there are also minorities of Serbian Orthodox (10.8%), Pentecostals (5.36%), Roman Catholics (2.71%) and Greek Catholics (1.61%). 4.03% of the population's religious affiliation is unknown.

References 

Communes in Timiș County
Localities in Romanian Banat